Christopher Joseph Başak, (born December 6, 1978) is an American former professional baseball infielder. He played for the New York Yankees of Major League Baseball in 2007. During his career, he played in the Yankees, New York Mets, Minnesota Twins and organizations. Basak made five appearances for the Yankees, receiving one at bat.

Career
Başak grew up in Joliet, Illinois, and attended Minooka High School in Minooka, Illinois. He then attended the University of Illinois, where he played college baseball as a shortstop for the Illinois Fighting Illini.

The New York Mets selected Başak in the sixth round, with the 185th overall selection, of the 2000 Major League Baseball draft. He hit .265 in his minor league career up until 2006, and had 161 stolen bases in 814 games. He mostly played shortstop. He signed with the Yankees in the 2006-07 offseason, and in the following spring training he hit .311.

Capable of playing any infield position, Başak played left and right field for the Scranton/Wilkes-Barre Yankees, the Yankees' Triple-A affiliate, where he led the team in doubles and was second in stolen bases. He was called up to the Yankees on June 6, 2007. He saw his first action on June 9, pinch running for, and subsequently replacing, third baseman Alex Rodriguez. On June 24, he got his first at bat, hitting a line drive that was caught by Barry Bonds. After playing sparingly, he was optioned back to Scranton/Wilkes-Barre on July 1, and replaced by Edwar Ramirez.

On July 27, the Yankees called up Başak from Triple-A, as Kei Igawa was optioned down. Başak was optioned back to Scranton/Wilkes-Barre on August 1. On August 15, he was designated for assignment to make room on the 40-man roster for Andrew Brackman. On August 16, 2007, he was claimed off waivers by the Twins. He played for the Twins' Triple-A affiliate, the Rochester Red Wings, and Scranton/Wilkes-Barre during the 2008 season. He got claimed off waivers by New York during the season. He retired after the 2008 season.

References

External links

Illinois Fighting Illini baseball players
People from North Platte, Nebraska
Baseball players from Nebraska
Major League Baseball shortstops
New York Yankees players
St. Lucie Mets players
Pittsfield Mets players
Binghamton Mets players
Norfolk Tides players
Rochester Red Wings players
Scranton/Wilkes-Barre Yankees players
1978 births
Living people
American people of Turkish descent
St. Cloud River Bats players